JetGreen Airways was an airline based in Ireland. It started and ceased operations in 2004.

History

References 

Defunct airlines of the Republic of Ireland
Airlines established in 2003
Airlines disestablished in 2004
Irish companies established in 2003
2004 disestablishments in Ireland